The Latch-Key Child is the debut studio album by American rapper A+. It was released on August 27, 1996 through Kedar Entertainment/Universal Records. Recording sessions took place at Battery Studios in New York. Production was handled by Smith Brothers Entertainment, Buckwild, Fabian Hamilton, Miladon, Carl Carr and Ike Lee, with Kedar Massenburg serving as executive producer. It features guest appearances from AZ, Prodigy, Q-Tip and Shakira Atily. The album peaked at #36 on the Top R&B/Hip-Hop Albums and #17 on the Top Heatseekers in the United States.

Track listing

Sample credits
Track 2 contains samples of "Stop Before We Start" written by Cynthia Girty and Arenita Walker and performed by Bobby Womack & Candi Staton and "Voyage to Atlantis" written by Rudolph Isley, Ronald Isley, Marvin Isley, Ernie Isley and Chris Jasper and performed by The Isley Brothers
Track 6 contains elements of "Touch" written by Pamela Sawyer and Frank Wilson
Track 7 contains elements of "Let's Get Closer" written by Harold Johnson
Track 9 contains a sample of "Living Without You" written by Michael Hepburn and Fred Reed, Jr. and performed by Pleasure
Track 11 contains a sample of "No One's Gonna Love You" written by Jimmy Jam and Terry Lewis and performed by The S.O.S. Band

Personnel

Andre "A+" Levins – main artist
Jonathan "Q-Tip" Davis – vocals (track 3)
Shakira Atily – vocals (track 4)
Albert "Prodigy" Johnson – vocals (track 5)
Anthony "AZ" Cruz – vocals (track 7)
Fabian Hamilton – producer (tracks: 1, 14)
Charles Smith – producer (tracks: 1, 2, 6, 9-12)
Joseph Smith – producer (tracks: 1, 2, 6, 9-12)
Elliot Smith – producer (tracks: 1, 2, 6, 9-12)
Anthony "Buckwild" Best – producer (tracks: 3, 8)
Carl Carr – producer (track 4)
K. "Miladon" Simpkins – producer (tracks: 5, 10)
Ike Lee – producer (track 7)
Michael Gilbert – recording, mixing (tracks: 4, 12)
Tim Latham – mixing (tracks: 1, 3, 5, 7, 8, 10, 13)
Daniel Wierup – mixing assistant (tracks: 1, 3, 5, 8, 10, 13), recording assistant (track 4), tracking assistant engineering
Jed Hackett – recording (track 2), mixing assistant (tracks: 2, 11, 12), recording assistant (track 12), additional tracking engineering
Russell Elevado – mixing (tracks: 2, 6, 9, 11)
Michael Shinn – additional drum programming (track 4)
John Kogan – recording (track 4)
Charles McCrorey – recording assistant (tracks: 4, 12), mixing assistant (track 7), tracking assistant engineering
Sharon Kearney – recording assistant (tracks: 5, 10)
Martin Czembor – mixing assistant (tracks: 6, 9), additional tracking engineering
Tim Donovan – recording (track 12), additional tracking engineering
Aidania Gonzalez – tracking assistant engineering
Kedar Massenburg – executive producer
The Drawing Board – art direction, design
Michael Lavine – photography
Alita Carter – sample clearances
Group Home Entertainment, Inc – management

Charts

References

External links

1996 debut albums
A+ (rapper) albums
Albums produced by Buckwild